Specialized in the areas of Corporate, Commercial, SME and Enterprise, Retail, Agricultural and Private Banking, Fibabanka offers services with a young and dynamic workforce.
Become the “Most Loved Bank of Turkey” while improving its service quality based on the needs and expectations of customers. Fibabanka also continues to diversify its products and services for customers via its subsidiaries, Fiba Portföy Yönetimi A.Ş. and Finberg. Fibabanka is a bank that provides consumer loans, vehicle loans, housing loans and commercial loans.

History

The Bank's history dates back to Sitebank A.Ş. The Bank was transferred to SDIF with its shares thereafter being sold to Novabank in 2002. The name of the Bank was changed to Bank Europe Bankası A.Ş. in 2003. In 2006, shares owned by Novabank S.A. were transferred to Millennium BCP; the Bank's name was changed to Millennium Bank A.Ş. After necessary permissions were obtained upon Fiba Group's application to the Banking Regulation and Supervision Agency, Millennium Bank A.Ş. joined Fiba Group on December 27, 2010. At the time, the name of the Bank was changed to Fibabanka A.Ş. As Fibabanka commenced providing banking services driven by the motto "Agile thinking, agile solution", Fibabanka takes a personal approach to customer service.

Pioneering Steps in the Journey of Digital Transformation

Embracing digital transformation and continuing to invest in alternative distribution channels, Fibabanka always provides fast, streamlined banking services to its customers. The Bank's delivery channels, include the branch networks, fibabanka.com.tr, 444 88 88 Telephone Banking, Internet and Mobile Banking and other digital channels. Driven by the long-standing history of Fiba Group in the finance sector, Fibabanka has steadily diversified its products and services to share transfer from Millennium Bank A.Ş. to Credit Europe Bank N.V., one of Fiba Group's major investments based in the Netherlands. In 2012, the shares of the Bank held by Credit Europe Bank N.V. were purchased by Fiba Holding A.Ş. In 2015, International Finance Corporation (IFC) and European Bank for Reconstruction and Development (EBRD), two global development institutions invested in the Bank, each acquiring a 9.95% stake through a capital increase. In 2016, TurkFinance B.V. (Abraaj), a private equity investor, acquired a 9.95% stake in the Bank. As the sale of shares to Abraaj was consummated via an issuance of new shares, the shares of IFC and EBRD in the Bank were reduced to 8.96% each. Following these investments, the Bank's capital increased to TL 941,160,553.25. Fiba Group continues to retain the majority stake in Fibabanka, with 71.57% of the Bank's share capital as of year-end 2018.

References

External links
Official website
Credit Europe NV official website

Banks established in 2010
Banks of Turkey
Companies listed on the Istanbul Stock Exchange
Companies based in Istanbul
2010 establishments in Turkey